Onlooker Nunatak is an isolated nunatak which protrudes prominently above the ice of the Rennick Glacier just southeast of Morozumi Range. Named by the northern party of New Zealand Geological Survey Antarctic Expedition (NZGSAE), 1963–64. The name is suggestive of the aspect of the feature.

Nunataks of Victoria Land
Pennell Coast